David Pye may refer to:

 Sir David Pye (engineer) (1886–1960), British mechanical engineer and academic administrator
 David Pye (furniture designer) (1914–1993), British professor of furniture design
 David Pye (zoologist) (born 1932), British zoologist